Cyperus fulvus is a species of sedge that is endemic to Papua New Guinea and north eastern Australia.

The species was first formally described by the botanist Robert Brown in 1810.

See also
 List of Cyperus species

References

fulvus
Taxa named by Robert Brown (botanist, born 1773)
Plants described in 1810
Flora of Queensland
Flora of New South Wales
Flora of the Northern Territory
Flora of Papua New Guinea